Cantharus is a genus of sea snails in the family Pisaniidae.

Taxonomy

This genus was previously placed in family Fasciolariidae by some authors. The genus is sometimes split into subgenera.

Species
, the World Register of Marine Species accepts 14 extant and 1 extinct species in the genus Cantharus:
 †Cantharus acuticingulatus  
 Cantharus berryi  
 Cantharus bolivianus 
 Cantharus cecillei 
 Cantharus erythrostoma 
 Cantharus leucotaeniatus 
 Cantharus melanostoma 
 Cantharus petwayae 
 Cantharus rehderi 
 Cantharus salalahensis 
 Cantharus septemcostatus 
 Cantharus spiralis 
 Cantharus tranquebaricus 
 Cantharus vermeiji 
 Cantharus vezzarochristofei 

Cantharus elegans  is present in some databases, but not the World Register of Marine Species. 

Cantharus porcatus  is listed as a taxon inquirendum in the World Register of Marine Species.

References

 Vaught, K.C. (1989). A classification of the living Mollusca. American Malacologists: Melbourne, FL (USA). . XII, 195 pp

Pisaniidae
Gastropod genera